The 2022 NCAA Division I Men's Golf Championship was a golf tournament contested from May 27 – June 1 at the Grayhawk Golf Club in Scottsdale, Arizona. It was the 83rd NCAA Division I Men's Golf Championship. The team championship was won by the Texas Longhorns who won their fourth national championship by defeating the Arizona State Sun Devils in the championship match play round 3–2. The individual national championship was won by Gordon Sargent from Vanderbilt University.

Regional qualifying tournaments 
 Five teams qualified from each of the six regional tournaments held around the country May 16–18, 2022.
 The lowest scoring individual not affiliated with one of the qualified teams in their regional also qualified for the individual national championship.

Venue 
This was the second consecutive NCAA Division I Men's Golf Championship held at the Grayhawk Golf Club in Scottsdale, Arizona. This would have been the third year of a planned three year stretch for Grayhawk hosting both men's and women's NCAA golf championships had the 2020 championship not been cancelled due to the COVID-19 pandemic. In October, 2020, the NCAA announced that Grayhawk would host the 2023 NCAA Division I Women's and Men's Golf Championship.

Team competition

Leaderboard 

 Par, single-round: 280
 Par, total: 1,120
 After 54 holes, the field of 30 teams was cut to the top 15.

 Remaining teams: Texas A&M (879), Kansas (880), Stanford (882), Arizona (883), Wake Forest (883), Florida State (887), BYU (887), Ohio State (893), North Florida (895), Georgia Southern (897), Liberty (898), Utah (904), South Florida (907), East Tennessee State (911), College of Charleston (913)
Source:

Match play bracket 

Source:

Individual competition

Leaderboard 

 Par, single-round: 70
 Par, total: 280
 The field was cut after 54 holes to the top 15 teams and the top nine individuals not on a top 15 team. These 84 players competed for the individual championship

 † Gordon Sargent won on the first hole of a sudden-death playoff

Source:

References 

NCAA Men's Golf Championship
Golf in Arizona
NCAA Division I Men's Golf Championship
NCAA Division I Men's Golf Championship
NCAA Division I Men's Golf Championship
NCAA Division I Men's Golf Championship